Hendarman Supandji (born January 6, 1947) is an Indonesian lawyer and politician from Klaten, Central Java, and a former Attorney General of Indonesia.

He graduated from the Law Faculty of Diponegoro University in 1972. He is currently part of the United Indonesia Cabinet and served as attorney general of Indonesia between May 7, 2007 and Sept. 23, 2010. He succeeded Abdul Rahman Saleh.

Hendarman's tenure as attorney general ended after the Indonesian Supreme Court upheld a review which stated that he should have been re-inaugurated at the start of President Susilo Bambang Yudhoyono's second term of office in 2009. 
The position is now occupied by acting Attorney General Darmono.

References

20th-century Indonesian lawyers
1947 births
Living people
Attorneys General of Indonesia
People from Klaten Regency
Diponegoro University alumni
Government ministers of Indonesia
21st-century Indonesian lawyers